Sonali Bendre (born 1 January 1975) is an Indian actress primarily known for her work in Hindi and Telugu films. She did modelling assignments prior to making her acting debut with Aag (1994), which won her the Filmfare Award for New Face of the Year and Screen Award for Best Female Debut. 

Bendre's career as a lead actress marked a turning point with Diljale (1996), a commercial success. The year 1998 brought her further success with Duplicate, Major Saab and Zakhm. Bendre achieved praises for her portrayal of leading lady in Sarfarosh and a shy doctor in Hum Saath Saath Hain, both (1999). For the former, she received IIFA Best Actress Award nomination. Post 2000, she appeared in supporting roles of an NRI in Hamara Dil Aapke Paas Hai (2000) and a doctor in Kal Ho Naa Ho (2003). She earned Screen Award for Best Supporting Actress for the former.

Bendre made her Tamil film debut with Kadhalar Dhinam (1999) and her Telugu debut with Murari (2001). She earned Filmfare Award for Best Actress – Telugu nomination for the latter. Her Marathi debut Anahat (2003), earned her Screen Award for Best Actress – Marathi. Her successful Telugu films include, Indra, Khadgam, Manmadhudu all (2002) and Shankar Dada MBBS (2004).

In addition to these, she has appeared as a judge on various reality shows and made her television debut with Ajeeb Daastaan Hai Ye (2014) and streaming debut with The Broken News (2022).

Early life and education
Bendre was born on 1 January 1975 in present-day Mumbai, Maharashtra in a Maharashtrian family.  She has 2 sisters. Her father was a civil servant. She completed her schooling from Kendriya Vidyalaya, Bangalore and completed her graduation from Ramnarain Ruia College, Mumbai.

Personal life

Bendre first met filmmaker Goldie Behl, son of director Ramesh Behl on the sets of her film Naaraaz. Bendre married Behl on 12 November 2002. They have one child.

Health
On 4 July 2018, Bendre announced that, she has been diagnosed with a metastatic cancer and was undergoing treatment in a New York City hospital. Despite having stage 4 cancer, the actress became cancer free in 2021.

Career

Modelling and film debut (1994-1995)
Bendre was a model before entering the Star Dust Talent Search. She made her film debut with Aag (1994) at the age of 19. For this, she won the Filmfare Award for Lux New Face of the Year and Screen Award for Best Female Debut. The same year, she also appeared in Naaraaz, for which she was awarded Filmfare's Sensational Debut award.

Bendre had three teleaes in 1995 with The Don, Gaddaar and Takkar. She also appeared in the song "Humma Humma" in the film, Bombay the same year.

Breakthrough and establishment (1996-2000)
Bendre had 5 releases in 1996, the year marked a turning point in her career. She starred in Rakshak with Sunil Shetty, English Babu Desi Mem with Shah Rukh Khan, Apne Dam Par, Sapoot with Suniel Shetty and Diljale with Ajay Devgn, which proved to be her breakthrough performance. It was a box-office hit. Planet Bollywood said, "Sonali Bendre is dashingly beautiful". Bendre starred in Bhai with Sunil Shetty, Tarazu with Akshay Kumar  and  Qahar with Sunny Deol, all in 1997.

1998 was another successful year for Bendre. She first appeared in Keemat – They Are Back with Saif Ali Khan, Humse Badhkar Kaun and Angaaray with Nagarjuna. She then appeared opposite Shah Rukh Khan in Duplicate, which was an average success. She received Zee Cine Award for Best Actor in a Supporting Role – Female nomination for the film. Her next two films with Ajay Devgn were box office success, Major Saab, where India Today called her "insipid" and Zakhm, where Planet Bollywood said, "she made an impact".

Bendre achieved further success in the year 1999. She first appeared opposite Aamir Khan in Sarfarosh. Filmfare noted, "Sonali does justice to her first real role, the only one worth talking about,that is." She received IIFA Best Actress Award nomination. She nexted portrayed a doctor in Hum Saath-Saath Hain opposite Salman Khan, the highest-grossing film of the year. India Today quoted, "The women mostly doll up, dance and cook." She then appeared in Dahek with Akshaye Khanna. The same year, she made her Tamil film debut with Kadhalar Dhinam opposite Kunal, a box office success. Then she had another Tamil release with Kannodu Kanbathellam with Arjun Sarja.

Bendre had five releases in 2000 too. She first made brief cameos in Chal Mere Bhai and Dhai Akshar Prem Ke. She then appeared in a supporting role in Gamara Dil Aapke Paas Hai with Anil Kapoor. She won Star Screen Award Best Supporting Actress, for her performance Planet Bollywood noted, "Bendre turns in a charming performance as Khushi. She looks beautiful and, for once, shows a glimmer of talent." Then she played the lead in Jis Desh Mein Ganga Rehta Hain with Govinda. In the same year, she made her Kannada film debut with Preethse, a remake of Darr.

Further success and break from films (2001-2012)

Bendre had three films in 2001. She made her Telugu film debut with Murari opposite Mahesh Babu. It was a box office success. She next appeared in Love Ke Liye Kuch Bhi Karega with Saif Ali Khan. She then appeared in the song "Saajan Ke Ghar Jaana Hai" in Lajja. Lastly, she appeared opposite Ajay Devgn in Tera Mera Saath Rahen. Rediff.com stated, "Sonali Bendre looks pretty but is not given much scope to act."

In 2002, Bendre starred in three successful Telugu films. She first appeared in Indra with Chiranjeevi. Idlebrain.com noted, "Sonali suited the role to tee and did her bit to perfection." She next appeared in Khadgam with Ravi Teja. Lastly, she appeared opposite Nagarjuna in Manmadhudu. Sify stated, "Sonali is excellent and has played her role with conviction."

Bendre had five films in 2003. She made her Marathi film debut with Anahat, for which she won Star Screen Award for Best Actress - Marathi. Rediff.com said, "Sonali Bendre has never looked so good, so sensual." She next appeared in Pyaar Kiya Nahin Jaatha with Diwakar Pundir. She then appeared in Telugu film Palnati Brahmanayudu with Nandamuri Balakrishna. Rediff.com said, "Sonali Bendre is good as the villain." She later apoeared in supporting roles in Chori Chori with Ajay Devgn, Rediff.com noted, "Bendre is required to look both beautiful and jealous and does it admirably." and in Kal Ho Naa Ho with Shah Rukh Khan.

In 2004, she starred in Shankar Dada M.B.B.S., a remake of Munna Bhai M.B.B.S. It was commercially successful. idlebrain.com stated, "Sonali Bendre is totally cool. She is the perfect choice for this role and has acted with ease.". She then made a special appearance in Aga Bai Arrecha!s song "Cham Cham Karta Hai". In 2007, Bendre starred in a play called Aap Ki Soniya. Post this, Bendre took a break from acting in films and shifted to television.

Bollywood comeback (2013-present)
Bendre made her film comeback with Once Upon a Time in Mumbai Dobaara!, where she appeared opposite Akshay Kumar. Her part was described by director Milan Luthria as, "Sonali's character is called Mumtaz. The character doesn't fit into the usual mould of a mother or a sister or bhabhi but has an identity of its own. That is what makes it special. And that's why Sonali agreed to be a part of the film." Hindustan Times said, "Sonali Bendre shines in the few scenes she has."

Bendre's much delayed film with Akshaye Khanna, Love You Hamesha, which was to be released in 2001, released in 2022 on NMP Movies YouTube channel.

Other ventures

Television
Bendre made her television debut with hosting the dance show Kya Masti Kya Dhoom....!. She went onto feature as a talent judge for Mr & Mrs Television, the reality shows Indian Idol 4, India's Got Talent, Hindustan Ke Hunarbaaz and India's Best Dramebaaz. She has hosted the 50th Filmfare Awards with Saif Ali Khan and Farida Jalal on 26 February 2005. She turned narrator for the show Mission Sapne on Colors TV in 2014.

Bendre made her television acting debut with the Life OK's series Ajeeb Dastaan Hai Yeh. She portrayed a housewife Shobha Sachdev opposite Apurva Agnihotri and Harsh Chhaya. She also turned judge for DID Li'ls Masters Season 5 in 2022, marking her television comeback after 4 years.

She made her streaming debut in 2022 with The Broken News, portraying a news channel head. Rediff.com noted, "Sonali stands out, delivering a nuanced performance. She aces the emotional scenes."

Off-screen work
When Michael Jackson performed at a concert in Mumbai in 1996, Bendre had the opportunity to welcome Jackson. She was dressed in a traditional Marathi sari and welcomed Jackson by applying the traditional ‘tilak’ on his forehead.

Bendre co-owns Pune Jaguars, a team at "The Tennis Premier League". She has ramp walked for Made In India and Pidilite - CPAA charity. She has also been cover model for various magazines including Vogue.

Bendre supports a number of causes. She has done charity for children's education and has been actively supporting cancer survivors. She says, "In whatever capacity I can, I will always be there to help and support the cause of cancer survivors."

Controversy
In 1998, Bendre was charged with poaching two blackbucks on the outskirts of Kankani village in Jodhpur district of Rajasthan during the filming of Hum Saath Saath Hain along with co-stars Salman Khan, Saif Ali Khan, Tabu and Neelam Kothari. A lower court charged her with the others under the Wildlife Protection Act, 1972 and the IPC. She had filed a revision petition before a sessions court which discharged her of Section 51 (causing harm to wildlife) of Wildlife Act and both of 147 (punishment for rioting) and 149 (unlawful assembly of persons) of the Indian Penal Code. The Rajasthan State Government then filed a revision petition before the Rajasthan High Court at Jodhpur which again added Section 149 against her, which had been dropped earlier. In December 2012, the Jodhpur court summoned her along with all the accused for commencement of the trial with the revised charges on 4 February 2013. Although Bendre was acquitted in the blackbuck poaching case on 5 April 2018, the Rajasthan High Court issued her with a notice, challenging her acquittal on 11 March 2019.

In 2012, was arrested by Mumbai Police for wearing thigh-length, lemon yellow kurta printed with reverent utterances and emblems like Om and Om Namah Shivay.

Public image 
Bendre has often been regarded as one of the most stylish actresses in Bollywood.

Bendre has termed her films, Naaraaz, Zakhm and Sarfarosh, among the best moments from Indian cinema. In a 1999 Interview with Rediff.com, she revealed her acting approach. She said, 

In addition to her acting career, Bendre is a prominent celebrity endorser for brands and products. Her most famous ad was for the Nirma soap. Zaral Shah of Verve termed her appearance, "ecstatic". She has also endorsed fairness cream, clothing brand Radha, with Aishwarya Rai Bachchan and Oriflame India.

In 2015, Bendre wrote a book named, "The Modern Gurukul: My Experiment with Parenting", which talks about her achievements and challenges as a first-time mother.

Filmography

Films

Television

Accolades

References

External links

 

1975 births
Living people
20th-century Indian actresses
Indian film actresses
Indian television actresses
Indian soap opera actresses
Actresses in Hindi cinema
Actresses in Telugu cinema
Actresses in Kannada cinema
Actresses in Marathi cinema
Actresses in Tamil cinema
Actresses in Hindi television
Female models from Mumbai
Indian women television presenters
Indian television presenters
Marathi people
Kendriya Vidyalaya alumni
Indian Hindus
Filmfare Awards winners
Screen Awards winners